Charles Chambers may refer to:
Charles Haddon Chambers (1860–1921), Australian-born dramatist, active in England
Charles Chambers (cricketer) (1870–1921), English cricketer
DJ Funk (born Charles Chambers), Chicago house DJ who pioneered the ghetto house subgenre of house music
Charles Edward Chambers (1883–1941), illustrator and painter
Charles Bosseron Chambers (1882–1964), painter, illustrator and teacher

See also

Chuck Chambers (disambiguation)
Charlie Chambers (disambiguation)